The 16th Legislative Assembly of British Columbia sat from 1924 to 1928. The members were elected in the British Columbia general election held in June 1924. The British Columbia Liberal Party, led by John Oliver, formed a minority government. Following Oliver's death in August 1927, John Duncan MacLean became Premier.

John Andrew Buckham served as speaker for the assembly.

Members of the 16th General Assembly 
The following members were elected to the assembly in 1924.:

Notes:

Party standings

By-elections 
By-elections were held for the following members appointed to the provincial cabinet, as was required at the time:
 Kenneth Cattanach MacDonald, defeated by Arthur Ormiston Cochrane, Conservative, October 9, 1924

By-elections were held to replace members for various other reasons:

Notes:

Other changes 
Shortly after the election Paul Phillips Harrison joins the Liberals while Richard John Burde becomes an independent.
George Alexander Walkem joins the Conservatives in 1928.
Nanaimo (dec. William Sloan March 2, 1928)
Vancouver City(res. Ian Alistair Mackenzie appointed Provincial Secretary June 5, 1928)

References 

Political history of British Columbia
Terms of British Columbia Parliaments
1924 establishments in British Columbia
1928 disestablishments in British Columbia
20th century in British Columbia